Bernhard Keller (born 1962) is a Swiss mathematician, specializing in algebra. He is a professor at the University of Paris.

Keller received in 1990 his PhD from the University of Zurich under Pierre Gabriel with the thesis On Derived Categories.

His research is in homological algebra and the representation theory of quivers and finite-dimensional algebras. He has applied triangulated Calabi–Yau categories to the (additive) categorification 
of cluster algebras. 
In 2013, he received an honorary degree from the University of Antwerp.
In 2014 he received the Sophie Germain Prize. 
He was an Invited Speaker at the International Congress of Mathematicians in Madrid in 2006,
with a talk On differential graded categories. 
Keller is a fellow of the American Mathematical Society.

Selected works
 with Idun Reiten:

References

External links
 Bernhard Keller's homepage

1964 births
Algebraists
20th-century Swiss mathematicians
21st-century Swiss mathematicians
University of Zurich alumni
Academic staff of the University of Paris
Living people
Fellows of the American Mathematical Society